Union Bridge station is a historic railway station in Union Bridge, Carroll County, Maryland.  It was built in 1902 as a stop for the Western Maryland Railway. It is representative of the rural railway stations constructed during the late 19th and early 20th centuries. The station's two buildings are arranged with their south façades lengthwise fronting the railroad tracks.

The railroad operated a major railroad car shop adjacent to the station from the late 19th century until the 1950s. The shop buildings were demolished in 1964.

The station was listed on the National Register of Historic Places in 1976 as Union Bridge Station.

Western Maryland Railway Historical Society Museum
The station is now the home of the Western Maryland Railway Historical Society Museum, which includes artifacts of the Western Maryland Railway.

See also
Union Bridge Historic District

References

External links
, including photo from 2000, at Maryland Historical Trust
Western Maryland Railway Historical Society

1902 establishments in Maryland
Transportation buildings and structures in Carroll County, Maryland
Railway stations on the National Register of Historic Places in Maryland
Railway workshops in the United States
Union Bridge
Railway stations in the United States opened in 1902
Museums in Carroll County, Maryland
Railroad museums in Maryland
Union Bridge, Maryland
National Register of Historic Places in Carroll County, Maryland
Railway workshops on the National Register of Historic Places
Railway buildings and structures on the National Register of Historic Places in Maryland
Industrial buildings and structures on the National Register of Historic Places in Maryland
Former railway stations in Maryland
Repurposed railway stations in the United States